La Voix du Nord (lit. The Voice of the North or The Voice of Nord) is a regional daily newspaper from the north of France. Its headquarters are in Lille.

History
Voix du Nord was one of the underground newspapers of the French Resistance founded in German-occupied France during World War II. The paper first appeared in Lille in April 1941 at a time when the region of Nord-Pas-de-Calais was being ruled by a German military government in Brussels. The newspaper's tag-line described itself as the "Resistance organ of French Flanders." 

The post-war version of the paper is part of the Belgian company, Rossel group, which also owns the major Belgian newspaper Le Soir, which it bought from Socpresse in 2006.

Origins in Occupied France 

 is a clandestine newspaper that gave rise to a movement of political resistance. The resistance group was called Voix du Nord ("Voice of the North"—of France, or, "Voice of the Nord"—a French department). Sixty-five copies of the first issue of the newspaper were printed, dated April 1941.  It clearly announced the newspaper's mission statement: 
The newspaper affirmed its support for General de Gaulle and its opposition to the Vichy government. Dumez was the heart and soul of the editorial staff: she was primarily responsible for the four hundred articles that appeared in the first 39 issues. Noutour was arrested on 8 September 1943 and deported to Gross Rosen, where he died 1 February 1945.

From the four Roneotyped pages of the first day, the newspaper rapidly grew to six, and then ten pages. Due to the difficulties in obtaining supplies of paper, the page count was later reduced to four pages in February 1943. Circulation was around 900 copies initially, growing to 15000 in January 1943. The paper came out every two weeks through September 1942, and monthly from 1943 on.

The last two issues were published in July and August 1944 under the responsibility of Jules Houcke, who published the first openly distributed issue of  "La Voix du Nord" on September 5, 1944. The first page is crossed out, with a headline spanning six columns: "The Northern Region is free. Freedom and independence were purchased at a high price: prison, torture, death camps for more than 530 people, who wrote, printed, and distributed these newspapers."

Modern 

After the war, the paper was reborn as a hybrid partnership and limited liability company "La Voix du Nord - Houcke and Company". For the original journalists who were actually part of the Resistance and notably the two co-founders who had not yet returned from deportation abroad in February of 1945, it was a betrayal by pseudo-Resistance members. The shares of the new company rose in 1945, the original owners and members were priced out, and it took thirty years of litigation before they achieved success. In the 1950s, the paper started printing various local editions, giving it a regional coverage.

Voix du Nord is published in tabloid. The paper sponsors the Grand Prix de Fourmies bicycle race.

Circulation

See also
 List of newspapers in France

References
Notes

Citations

Further reading

External links
 
 Issues of underground La Voix du Nord  online in Gallica, the digital library of the BnF.

1941 establishments in France
French resistance publications
Mass media in Lille
Daily newspapers published in France
Newspapers established in 1941